Carposina proconsularis is a moth in the family Carposinidae. It was described by Edward Meyrick in 1921. It is found in South Africa.

References

Endemic moths of South Africa
Carposinidae
Moths described in 1921
Moths of Africa